The Rev-Erb proteins are members of the nuclear receptor (NR) superfamily of intracellular transcription factors and key regulatory components of the circadian clock. There are two forms of the receptor, Rev-Erb alpha and Rev-Erb beta, which are each encoded by a separate gene (NR1D1 and NR1D2, respectively).  

These proteins act as key regulators of clock gene expression through transcriptional repression of Bmal1. Through their regulation of clock-controlled genes, the Rev-Erb proteins affect several physiological processes throughout the body, including metabolic, endocrine, and immune pathways.

In the NRNC classification scheme, Rev-Erb is nuclear receptor subfamily 1 group D (NR1D). The name "Rev-Erb" derived by truncation from "Rev-ERBA" (Rev-Erbα), which in turn was named because it was on the opposite strand of ERBA (THRA) oncogene. The paralogous Rev-Erbβ does not seem to have anything special on its reverse strand. Older sources may use "Rev-ERBA" as the family name.

See also 

 Rev-Erbɑ
 Rev-Erbβ
 Nuclear Receptors
 Transcription Factors
 Circadian Clock

References

External links 
 
 
 

1